Nippon Club may refer to;

Nippon Club (New York), founded in 1905 in the United States.
Nippon Club (Johannesburg), founded in 1961.